Vintage Props and Jets was a commuter airline based in New Smyrna Beach, Florida. The airline provided daily flights between selected cities in Florida and The Bahamas.

History
Vintage Props and Jets had been in business as a scheduled airline since 1991, more than most carriers between Florida and the Bahamas. Vintage Props and Jets also maintained a repair station at New Smyrna Beach Airport that specialized in Beechcraft equipment.  The carrier also provided aircraft management for individuals owning Beechcraft King Air 100 & 200 series equipment; but its core operations remained the scheduled airline service. The airline started looking for ways to increase revenues during the off-season and embarked on adding west-coast Florida operations in 2007, which included Naples, Key West, and Tampa.  The carrier also bid on EAS markets in an attempt to help increase overall flying.  In the summer of 2008, Vintage had wet leased an Embraer ERJ-145 regional jet from ExpressJet Airlines to operate select Saturday-only services between Daytona Beach, Ft Lauderdale, and Jacksonville to and from Marsh Harbour and Treasure Cay in the Bahamas.

The airline had bid for EAS services between Athens, Georgia; Macon, Georgia; Atlanta, Georgia and Sanford/Orlando, Florida.

On July 18, 2008, Vintage Props and Jets ceased operations and filed for Chapter 11 bankruptcy protection as it struggled with rising fuel costs & aircraft maintenance expenses.

Destinations 
Florida
Daytona Beach
Melbourne
Fort Lauderdale
Marathon
Key West
Naples - Seasonal
Jacksonville - Seasonal (Saturdays Only)
Key West - Seasonal

Bahamas
Treasure Cay
Marsh Harbour
Freeport

Fleet

 Beechcraft King Air turboprops (100 and 200 series models)
 Beechcraft 1900 turboprops
 Embraer ERJ-145 regional jet (wet leased from ExpressJet)

See also 
 List of defunct airlines of the United States

References

Companies based in Volusia County, Florida
New Smyrna Beach, Florida
Defunct companies based in Florida
Airlines based in Florida
Airlines established in 1991
Airlines disestablished in 2008
Defunct airlines of the United States
1991 establishments in Florida
2008 disestablishments in Florida
Companies that filed for Chapter 11 bankruptcy in 2008